Sydney Kumalo (1935–1988) was a South African contemporary artist and sculptor. He's most know for his work with metal and creating metal figures with his sculptures.

Early life 
Kumalo was born in 1935 in Sophiatown, Johannesburg and raised in a Zulu family. This upbringing, cultural, and political differences in his community would later have a good amount of influence within his work. He attended Madibane High School in Soweto, South Africa. He then attended the Polly Street Art Center in 1952 to get a start on his art training. He went to the art center until 1957. Also in 1957, he was commissioned to do a church piece, which was his first big opportunity as an artist. He originally worked with watercolor paint, was commissioned to do artwork for church ceilings, and later in his career started to use more mixed media.

Art Education/Polly Street Art Center 
Most of his art training came from the Polly Street Art Center. There he received guidance from Cecil Skotnes and Egon Guenther. In 1958, Kumalo studied with Edoardo Villa, a South African sculptor, for 2 years. He also worked as an assistant to Skotnes. Working with Villa had a great influence on Kumalo's style and form of expression. He also worked on his medium of metal casting. He helped to implement modernism with an African background into Kumalo's work. In 1960, he began to teach at the center full time until 1964. During this time he moved from Art Center to the Jubilee Social Center located in Soweto. 

He was part of the Amadlozi Group founded in 1961, which included  Cecily Sash, Cecil Skotnes, Edoardo Villa, and Guiseppe Cattaneo. The name “Amadlozi” (Zulu: ancestors) was used for a conscious appropriation of African sculptural traditions; this group had an African influence in their art and to use their culture as a form of expression. Their group was promoted by Guenther. Guenther influenced the group with German Expressionism and had them hold exhibitions in Italy during 1963 and 1964. This would be the start of Kumalo's international career. Kumalo became a full-time artist after 1964, which in turn, had him resign from his teaching career at the Art Center.

International career 
Kumalo's international career truly began in the mid 1960's.  He participated in exhibitions in locations such as Europe and New York. He was invited to multiple international events and to receive awards. In 1967, he was invited to visit the USA and Europe because he was a guest at the United States/South African Leadership Exchange Programme, or the USSALEP. He won a travel bursary from the Transvaal Academy in 1967. Kumalo was also a guest in 1960 at the "Artists of Fame and Promise Exhibition" His work was included in multiple South African exhibitions such as the Cape Town Triennial in 1985 and in 1988 in "The Neglected Tradition Exhibition" at the Johannesburg Art Gallery. While still travelling internationally, he still managed to contribute to Republic Festival exhibitions. He also won first prize at a South African Race Relations Exhibition located in Durban.

Art Style 
Kumalo's most used medium was terra cotta. The terra cotta was then cast in bronze. His work showed a great amount of expressionism and contemporary aspects. It also showed ideas of symbolism and imagery. There was a large attention to detail during the molding and casting process. It's evident that he took inspiration from life in his work. His main subject for his work were mostly humans and using the human body to convey certain scenes and emotions. He took into account that different bodily motions, configurations, and rhythms were a way of expressing spiritual feelings. The themes that he work with the most were the idea of the human, the beast, and shaping the human body into anthropomorphic forms. He work mostly reflects things such as on reincarnation, the influences of good and evil, and the influence of ancestors.

Kumalo saw the human body and the animal body to be in close relation to each other physically and spiritually. The stance of his figures mostly resemble animals. His work can be closely related to early African carvings and tribal art. They both conveyed true passion and emotion and showed the fear of evil powers over them that they had no control of. His style can also show influences from primitivism. Many of his works' facial expressions could be compared to African Tribal masks. His figures where usually disproportionate with larger features and elongated torsos. There is a sense of controlled movement, simplicity, and somewhat restraint within his work.

Exhibitions 
 Exhibited in 1963 and 1964 with Amadlozi in Rome, Florence, Milan, and Venice
 African painters and Sculptor in Johannesburg Exhibition, Piccadilly Gallery, London in 1965
 Represented South Africa in Contemporary African Art Exhibition in Camden Arts Centre in London in 1969
 Participated in Sao Paulo Biennale in 1967
 Republic Festival Art Exhibition in Cape Town and Durban in 1971 and 1981
 Art included in Black Art Today exhibition in Soweto in 1981
 South African Art Exhibition at the National Gallery, Gaborone in Botswana
 New York Exhibition of Amadlozi work in 1985
 Participated in Cape Town Triennial in 1985
 Historical Perspectives of Black Art Exhibition in 1986
 Vita Art Now Exhibition at Johannesburg Art Gallery in 1988

References 

South African sculptors
1935 births
1988 deaths